Antanandrenitelo is a town  in Madagascar. It belongs to the district of Antsiranana II, which is a part of Diana Region.

Geography 
Antanandrenitelo is situated at the Route Nationale 6 between Mahavanona and Sadjoavato.

Sights
The Tsingy Rouge are situated near this town.

References and notes 

Populated places in Diana Region